Niagara is a town in Niagara County, New York, United States.  As of the 2010 census, the town had a total population of 8,378.  The town is named after the famous waterfall Niagara Falls.

The Town of Niagara is the neighbor to the City of Niagara Falls, which is next to the famed Niagara Falls.  The town is located in the southwest corner of the county. Also located partially within the town is Niagara Falls International Airport, which serves the Niagara County area.

It is served by the LaSalle Post Office on Niagara Falls Boulevard (U.S. Route 62) in adjacent Niagara Falls, New York. Residents use a mailing address of "Niagara Falls, NY" because of this. Neither "Niagara, NY," nor "Town of Niagara, NY" are acceptable postal addresses, according to the United States Postal Service.

History 
The Town of Niagara was founded in 1812 (originally as the "Town of Schlosser" after the local fortification Fort Schlosser and after Captain Joseph Schlosser, a German officer in the British Army) from the Town of Cambria. In 1836 eastern parts of the town were organized as the Town of Wheatfield, New York.

In 1892, the City of Niagara Falls was formed from the western end of town, taking about half of its land. In 1897, the Village of LaSalle was incorporated in what was then the southeast corner of the town. Its borders have remained the same since.

Geography

Adjacent cities and towns 
Town of Lewiston - north
Town of Wheatfield - east
City of Niagara Falls - west, south

Major highways in the Town of Niagara
 Interstate 190 (Niagara Expressway), This interstate through the western part of town from the Niagara Falls city line to the Lewiston town line. In the town, there are exits at Porter Rd. (NY 182) and Witmer Rd. (NY 31).
 U.S. Route 62 (Niagara Falls Blvd.), North-South highway that has a short distance in the town from the Wheatfield town line to the Niagara Falls city line.
 New York State Route 31 (Witmer Rd., Saunders Settlement Rd.), East-West Highway across the northwestern part of town from the Lewiston town line to the Niagara Falls city line.
 New York State Route 61 (Hyde Park Blvd.), North-South Roadway mostly in the City of Niagara Falls, but has a short distance in the southwest corner of town where the route has its northern end at Lewiston Rd. (NY 104).
 New York State Route 182 (Porter Rd.), East-West roadway through the town from the Niagara Falls city line near its interchange with I-190 to its eastern terminus at Niagara Falls Blvd. (US 62).
 New York State Route 265 (Military Rd.), North-South roadway through the town from the Niagara Falls city line to the Lewiston town line.

Notable person
James Madison, Medal of Honor recipient

Demographics

As of the census of 2000, there were 8,978 people, 3,611 households, and 2,480 families residing in the town.  The population density was 955.8 people per square mile (369.2/km2).  There were 3,879 housing units at an average density of 412.9 per square mile (159.5/km2).  The racial makeup of the town was 92.99% White, 3.02% African American, 1.47% Native American, 0.56% Asian, 0.02% Pacific Islander, 0.22% from other races, and 1.72% from two or more races. Hispanic or Latino of any race were 1.17% of the population.

There were 3,611 households, out of which 29.6% had children under the age of 18 living with them, 51.1% were married couples living together, 13.0% had a female householder with no husband present, and 31.3% were non-families. 26.1% of all households were made up of individuals, and 9.9% had someone living alone who was 65 years of age or older.  The average household size was 2.49 and the average family size was 2.99.

In the town, the population was spread out, with 23.4% under the age of 18, 8.9% from 18 to 24, 28.0% from 25 to 44, 25.1% from 45 to 64, and 14.6% who were 65 years of age or older.  The median age was 39 years. For every 100 females, there were 95.1 males.  For every 100 females age 18 and over, there were 92.3 males.

The median income for a household in the town was $37,327, and the median income for a family was $43,689. Males had a median income of $35,657 versus $25,358 for females. The per capita income for the town was $17,500.  About 7.1% of families and 9.3% of the population were below the poverty line, including 14.6% of those under age 18 and 3.9% of those age 65 or over.

Communities
 Pletchers Corners
 Cayuga Village
 Belden Center
 colonial village

Economy

Major employers in Niagara are retail stores along major routes in town, including:

 Fashion Outlets of Niagara Falls
 Niagara Stone Corporation Redland Quarry - limestone quarry
 Niagara Falls International Airport
 New York Air National Guard
 New York Air Force Reserve
 Air Force Reserve Center
 Wegmans (Hills) Plaza
 Mil-Pine Plaza
 Witmer Industrial Estate

Services

Niagara Active Hose Company provides fire protection to Niagara from their fire hall on Lockport Road.

References

External links
 Town of Niagara webpage

Buffalo–Niagara Falls metropolitan area
Towns in Niagara County, New York